The Slovenia national baseball team is the national baseball team of Slovenia. The team competes in the bi-annual European Baseball Championship. The President of the Slovenia Baseball Association is Marko Mrdjenovič. The president represents Slovenia for both the Confederation of European Baseball and the World Baseball Softball Association.

Roster
Slovenia's roster for the European Baseball Championship Qualifier 2022, the last official competition in which the team took part.

References

National baseball teams in Europe
Baseball